Tyria may refer to:

Tyria (moth), a genus of moths in the family Erebidae
Tyria (river), a river in northwestern Greece
Tyria, Greece, a village in the municipal unit Selloi, Ioannina regional unit, Greece
Tyria (planet), fantasy world on which Guild Wars and Guild Wars 2 video games are set
Tyria (plant), a synonym of the Euphorbiaceae Bernardia
Tyria (mythology)